Nefedovo is a rural locality (a village) in Andreyevskoye Rural Settlement, Vashkinsky District, Vologda Oblast, Russia. The population was 11 as of 2002.

Geography 
Nefedovo is located 44 km north of Lipin Bor (the district's administrative centre) by road. Nikonovo is the nearest rural locality.

References 

Rural localities in Vashkinsky District